Bankers Petroleum Ltd. is  a Chinese-owned Canadian oil company operating in Albania.

History of Purchase 
In March 2016, Geo-Jade Petroleum made an all-cash offer of 2.20 CAD per share to purchase the company in a deal worth 575 million CAD (an equivalent of US$425 million). Geo-Jade Petroleum is a Chinese company that owns Bankers Petroleum Ltd. ever since.

Importance in the Albanian Market 
After investments of more than US$2.5 billion at its Patos-Marinza oilfield, Bankers now produces 95% of Albania's crude oil.

Tax Evasion 
In June 2019, Bankers Petroleum was fined 120 million EUR for tax evasion. The fine came as result of a two-year investigation carried out by the General Customs Directory. From 2014 to 2018, Bankers Petroleum has evaded 30 million EUR in excise for raw materials, which is used for the production of crude oil. This is about the half-prepared fuel, called “solar”, and which is used to process crude oil.

Criminal Investigations 
In October 2019 Albania's competition authority launched an in-depth abuse of dominance investigation into Bankers Petroleum. The company told the international news organization Reuters that had “Bankers has never violated free market and competition rules and moreover has abused with any ‘dominant’ position.” According to Reuters, Bankers was reacting to a six-month investigation launched by the Competition Authority into its business from Jan. 1, 2016 to October 2019 to see whether it had abused its dominant position complaints to the regulator from a local refiner. TOSK ENERGJI SH.A. argued that Bankers had either refused to supply it or imposed conditions on its supplies, causing financial costs, particularly related to having to shut down and restart the refinery at Ballsh.

References

External links

Oil companies of Albania
Oil companies of Canada